Hironaga (written: 廣永 or 廣長) is a Japanese surname. Notable people with the surname include:

 , Japanese footballer
 , Japanese footballer

Japanese-language surnames